Bankata is a City of Sankhar in Chapakot of Syangja District of Gandaki Province in Nepal. According to the 2011 Nepal census, it had a total population of 350.

References

External links 
Chapakot Municipality
District Coordination Committee Office, Syangja, Nepal

See also

Syangja District
Populated places in Syangja District